Lucien Pierre Brouillard, better known as Lou Brouillard, (May 23, 1911 – September 14, 1984), was a Canadian professional boxer who held the World Welterweight Title and a version of the World Middleweight Title. Statistical boxing website BoxRec ranks Brouillard as the 14th best middleweight of all-time and the 3rd best Canadian boxer ever. During his career he faced the likes of Mickey Walker, Young Corbett III, Jimmy McLarnin, Marcel Thil, and Fred Apostoli. Brouillard was inducted into the World Boxing Hall of Fame in 2000 and the International Boxing Hall of Fame in 2006.

Boxing career

World welterweight champion

According to an "Oddities of the Sports World" newspaper column of Sept. 23, 1931, Brouillard started as a right-handed boxer. Early on, however, he broke some rib bones on his right side, hampering his ability to hit with his right hand. He therefore converted to a southpaw.

Brouillard turned pro in 1928 and racked up an impressive 61-7 record before his was given a title shot by Jack Thompson for the World Welterweight title. On October 23, 1931, after knocking down Thompson four times during the course of the bout, Brouillard was awarded the unanimous decision and emerged as the new titleholder.  However, he would lose the title during his first defense just a few months later on January 28, 1932 to Jackie Fields.

NYSAC middleweight champion

On August 4, 1932, Brouillard bested future Hall of Famer Jimmy McLarnin via split decision in a non-title bout. In 1933 he beat another all-time great in Mickey Walker via unanimous decision over 10 rounds.

On August 9, 1933, he won the NYSAC World Middleweight Title by defeating Ben Jeby by KO at the Polo Grounds in New York. After being jointly recognized as champion by the National Boxing Association, he lost the title in his first defense against Vince Dundee via unanimous decision later that year.

Later career

After beating yet another Hall of Famer in Young Corbett III, Brouillard travelled to France to square of against Marcel Thil on November 25, 1935. Although he lost a 12-round unanimous decision, Brouillard put up a stiff challenge and was given the opportunity to rematch Thil; this time with his IBU Middleweight title on the line. Brouillard faced Thil twice more, each time being disqualified after the reigning champion fell to the ground clutching his groin.

Brouillard fought well past the age of optimal retirement, losing 10 of his last 27 fights. Despite his lack of success, he continued facing world-class opposition; including  Teddy Yarosz, Gus Lesnevich, and Lloyd Marshall. Brouillard retired after a 10-round majority decision loss to Henry Chmielewski on January 12, 1940.

He died on 14 September 1984 and is buried in Halifax Town Cemetery in Halifax, Massachusetts.

Professional boxing record
All information in this section is derived from BoxRec, unless otherwise stated.

Official Record

All newspaper decisions are officially regarded as “no decision” bouts and are not counted to the win/loss/draw column.

Unofficial record

Record with the inclusion of newspaper decisions to the win/loss/draw column.

See also
List of welterweight boxing champions
List of middleweight boxing champions

References

External links
 

https://boxrec.com/media/index.php/The_Ring_Magazine%27s_Annual_Ratings:_Welterweight--1930s
https://boxrec.com/media/index.php/National_Boxing_Association%27s_Quarterly_Ratings:_1933
https://titlehistories.com/boxing/na/usa/ny/nysac-m.html

|-

1911 births
1984 deaths
Welterweight boxers
World welterweight boxing champions
World boxing champions
Sportspeople from Quebec
People from Centre-du-Québec
Canadian male boxers